Mihail Lazarov Hristov (born August 31, 1980 in Varna) is a retired Bulgarian football defender. He was a right back, but he could also play as a centre back. Lazarov's first club was Spartak Varna. He also played for Naftex Burgas, Rodopa Smolyan and Cherno More.

References

1980 births
Living people
Bulgarian footballers
First Professional Football League (Bulgaria) players
PFC Spartak Varna players
Neftochimic Burgas players
PFC Rodopa Smolyan players
PFC Cherno More Varna players
Association football defenders